These Are the Good Times People is the fifth studio album by The Presidents of the United States of America. It was released on March 11, 2008. This is their first album to feature Andrew McKeag instead of Dave Dederer on guitbass.

Track listing
All songs written by Chris Ballew unless otherwise noted.

"More Bad Times" is a loose cover of an Ed's Redeeming Qualities song.

Bonus Tracks
"Rooftops in Spain" – 2:41 (UK iTunes / Japan CD)
"Scrappy Puppy" – 2:54 (all iTunes)
"Truckstop on the Moon" – 4:14 (Walmart mp3 store)
"What the Hell" – 3:30 (Amazon / Napster)

Personnel
 Chris Ballew – vocals, bass
 Andrew McKeag – guitars
 Jason Finn – drums
 Nikka Costa – vocals on "Deleter"
 Mark Hoyt  – backing vocals on "Poor Turtle"
 The Love Lights Horn Section - on "Sharpen Up Those Fangs", "Ghosts are Everywhere" and "Deleter"
Jerimiah Austin – trumpet
Sarah Jerns – trumpet
Diana Dizard – baritone sax
 Martin Feveyear – mixing

Response

Critical response to These Are the Good Times People was mixed. The album so far has a Metacritic rating of 56 out of 100 based on "mixed or average reviews". musicOMH remarked, "There's nothing complicated on this album, but then when did things ever need to be complicated?"  Allmusic said that in view of the lineup changes, the album is "perhaps their most eclectic album to date."  Billboard found that while nothing on the album is as immediately memorable as "Lump" or "Peaches," several tracks "come across as less novelty-like as a result of songcraft." Uncut magazine felt the record was "the desperate death-throe of a rank '90s relic."

References

External links
 

2008 albums
Albums produced by Kurt Bloch
The Presidents of the United States of America (band) albums